International Aviation College, Ilorin is an aviation training school in Ilorin, Kwara State, Nigeria. The college was established in 2011 by the Kwara State Government through a public private partnership with an aviation consult.
The college is located along Airport road, Ilorin and is very close to the Ilorin international airport. The college has trained over 110 pilots since its establishment. The college appoints AVM Abdul Yekini Bello (rtd) as new rector on 1st of March, 2022.

References 

Aviation in Nigeria
Aviation schools